Major-General Bill Withall CB (14 October 1928 – 21 February 2020) joined the Army in 1950 and after completing his Officer Cadet training at Mons Officer Cadet School was commissioned in the Corps of Royal Engineers.

He was a graduate of the Staff College, Camberley (1961), the Joint Services Staff College, Latimer (1967) and the National Defence College of India (1977). He commanded a Field Squadron of Strategic Reserve and spent a year in Aden in 1965 building roads and airstrips in the foothills of the Radfan and he commanded a Regiment in BAOR in 1972. He then spent two and a half years as MA to the MGO and in 1974 he was Colonel, General Staff, at the Royal School of Military Engineering, being responsible worldwide for Combat Engineer tactics and training. He was also involved in the arrangements for bringing the Combat Engineer Tractor into service.

He commanded 26 Engineer Regiment in the early 1970s and went on to command 11 Engineer Brigade at Aldershot before going to India in 1977 to attend the National Defence College.
He qualified as an Army pilot in January 1979 prior to assuming an appointment as Director Army Air Corps, a post he held until 1983. From 1984 to 1997 he was Colonel Commandant Royal Engineers.

Withall was a keen games player. He played rugby and cricket at County level and also represented the Army at both sports, serving as Chairman of the Army Football Association from 1980 to 1981 and President of the Army Cricket Association from 1981 to 1983.

He was a supporter of Arsenal Football Club.

Early life
Withall attended St Benedict's School, Ealing from 1940–1945.

Other roles
 Honorary Life Vice Pres., Aircrew Assoc., 1986
 Chairman, RE Assoc., 1993–97
 Chairman., Chute Parish Council, 1995–2002
 Freeman, City of London, 1981
 Liveryman, Hon. Co. of Air Pilots (formerly GAPAN), 1981

Clubs
 MCC
 I Zingari
 Band of Brothers
 Free Foresters Cricket Club
 Stragglers of Asia

References 

1928 births
2020 deaths
Graduates of the Mons Officer Cadet School
Graduates of the Staff College, Camberley
Royal Engineers officers